In corporate governance, the outrage constraint is an upper limit on executive pay.

References

Corporate governance
Executive compensation